Eupithecia subfenestrata is a moth in the family Geometridae. It is found in Russia and Turkey.

References

Moths described in 1892
subfenestrata
Moths of Europe
Moths of Asia